"Near Wild Heaven" is a song by American rock band R.E.M., released in August 1991 as the third single from their seventh studio album, Out of Time (1991). The song was also the first single released by the band to have had its lyrics both co-written and sung by bassist Mike Mills. According to a quote from Peter Buck in R.E.M. Inside Out: The Stories Behind Every Song by Craig Rosen, the lyrics are a collaboration between Mills and lead singer Michael Stipe. It peaked at No. 27 on the UK Singles Chart but the single was not released in the United States. Mike Mills had written the lyrics to the single "(Don't Go Back to) Rockville", and he had sung the cover song "Superman", but he had not sung his own work on a released-as-a-single recording.

Critical reception
Parry Gettelman from Orlando Sentinel felt that "Near Wild Heaven" "already overdoes the contrast between dark-edged lyrics and a light-hearted melody by folding Mike Mills' lead vocal into a sugary arrangement. Adding strings to the recipe is like putting frosting on cherry pie."

Music video
The accompanying music video for "Near Wild Heaven" features the band playing the song in a crowded café.

Track listing
All songs written by Bill Berry, Peter Buck, Mike Mills, and Michael Stipe unless otherwise indicated.

7" / cassette "Near Wild Heaven"
 "Pop Song '89" (live)1

 12" "Near Wild Heaven"
 "Pop Song '89" (live)1
 "Half a World Away" (live)2

 CD' "Near Wild Heaven" – 3:18
 "Tom's Diner" (Suzanne Vega) (live)1 – 2:04
 "Low" (live)1 – 4:59
 "Endgame" (live)1 – 3:28

Notes
1 Recorded at The Borderline Club, London, England; March 15, 1991. Further songs from this performance were later released on an album.
2 Recorded on Rockline'', Los Angeles, California; April 1, 1991.

Personnel
 Bill Berry – drums, piano, backing vocals
 Peter Buck – guitar
 Mike Mills – lead vocals, bass guitar
 Michael Stipe – backing vocals

Charts

References

External links
 

1991 singles
R.E.M. songs
Songs written by Bill Berry
Songs written by Peter Buck
Songs written by Mike Mills
Songs written by Michael Stipe
Warner Records singles
Song recordings produced by Scott Litt
Song recordings produced by Michael Stipe
Song recordings produced by Mike Mills
Song recordings produced by Bill Berry
Song recordings produced by Peter Buck
1991 songs
Sunshine pop songs